are a type of arcade game commonly found in amusement arcades and casinos, especially in Japan. In order to play a medal game, a customer must first exchange their cash into medals (metal coins, much like an arcade token). The rate of medals versus cash varies from arcade to arcade, but usually the cheapest range is from ¥300 all the way up to ¥10,000.  

While many of the medal games simulate gambling, the medals cannot be traded back into cash, but only used to play more games, or exchanged (via paper tickets) for prizes.

There are many types of medal games, but the two most popular are the gambling type and the pusher game type.

Gambling type 
The gambling type of medal games has two types of games, those that simulate a Las Vegas style casino (Electronic/Mechanical roulette tables, video poker, video blackjack, slot machines, are all very common).

The other type is video horse racing. These are often set up in a quite lavish lounge set up, each player has a personal screen,  often with a padded chair, an ashtray and cup holders. All of these personal seats are in front of a very large screen displaying the virtual horse race.

In the Philippines, video horse racing is also known as "video karera". These games are often raided by police as some proprietors try to evade taxes.

Pusher game type   

These games are characterized by multiple levels filled with medals or coins. Behind these platforms are mechanical "brooms" that push the coins forward. When a coin is dropped in, it falls onto one of the platforms and has the chance of pushing other coins (and possibly prizes placed on top of the coins) off the edge and being awarded to the player, unless they fall in the left and right 'lose' side of the edge. Timing in dropping the coin is a skill factor in the game.

In the United Kingdom, pusher games — often called "penny falls" — are very popular in arcades, and can often be found at tourist attractions such as theme parks and bowling alleys. Often, these machines use real coins rather than tokens (usually a low denomination such as the 2p or 10p), but otherwise behave in the same way as games that operate with medals or tokens.

Variations on the pusher game can be much more complex.  They often involve a Plinko-style chute that causes the coin to drop in which there are different slots the dropped medal can fall into, causing various in game effects.  Some slots may have the machine drop in more coins, others may initiate a video slot machine built into the machine.  From the video slot machine more coins and other bonuses can be awarded.  

Many pusher games are connected to one another, some even with shared platforms, to form mega jackpots, sometimes as many as 100,000+ medals.  Sometimes a video mini game can be activated, in which coins must be dropped or rolled to hit specific targets, or buttons on the machine must be pressed in order to play.  For example, a mini game could involve pressing a star shaped button to make Mario jump and hit coin blocks, which could give coins.

Another aspect of the pusher games is that they are often themed on things targeted towards children, such as video game and cartoon characters.

List of games

See also

 Pachinko
 Redemption game
 Tipping Point, a UK game show based around a giant pusher machine

References

Arcade games
Gambling games
Gaming devices